Craig Cameron may refer to:

Craig Cameron (ice hockey) (1945–2012), National Hockey League player
Craig Cameron (horse trainer) (born 1949), American Natural Horsemanship practitioner
 Craig E. Cameron, American microbiologist and biochemist